Sisseton Lake is a lake in Martin County, in the U.S. state of Minnesota.

Sisseton Lake was named for the Sisseton Sioux.

References

Lakes of Minnesota
Lakes of Martin County, Minnesota